Hypsoblennius gilberti, commonly known as the rockpool blenny, is a species of combtooth blenny found in the eastern Pacific Ocean. This species grows to a length of  TL. The specific name honours the American ichthyologist Charles H. Gilbert (1859-1928).

References

gilberti
Fish described in 1882
Taxa named by David Starr Jordan